Third-seeded Shirley Fry defeated Doris Hart 6–3, 3–6, 6–3 in the final to win the women's singles tennis title at the 1951 French Championships.

Seeds
The seeded players are listed below. Shirley Fry is the champion; others show the round in which they were eliminated.

 Doris Hart (finalist)
 Margaret Osborne duPont (semifinals)
 Shirley Fry (champion)
 Jean Walker-Smith (semifinals)
 Beverley Baker (quarterfinals)
 Thelma Coyne Long (quarterfinals)
 Nelly Adamson (quarterfinals)
 Joy Gannon Mottram (third round)

Main draw

Finals

Top half

Section 1

Section 2

Bottom half

Section 3

Section 4

References 

French Championships - Women's Singles
French Championships (tennis) by year – Women's singles
1951 in French women's sport
1951 in French tennis